State Highway 19 (SH 19) is a state highway in Texas runs from  Huntsville to Paris in east Texas.

Route description
SH 19 begins at an interchange with Interstate 45 in southeast Huntsville. The highway runs through the eastern edge of the town as an expressway running close to the Sam Houston National Forest. The expressway ends at an intersection with State Highway 30 and runs through rural areas before reaching the town of Trinity. SH 19 runs north towards Crockett where the highway begins a concurrency with US 287. The two highways leave each other just northwest of Palestine. SH 19 runs northwest to Athens, running around the town with US 175/State Highway 31. The highway next runs through Canton, where it intersects Interstate 20. SH 19 runs through more rural areas of East Texas until the highway comes to Emory. The highway turns more northeast before running through the western part of Sulphur Springs. State Highway 154 joins SH 19, before leaving just east of Cooper. State Highway 24 joins the highway, where the two highways run together before ending in Paris.

A widening project for SH 19 between Montalba, north of Palestine, and Athens began in 2013, providing passing lanes, left turn lanes, and a shoulder. The segment in Henderson County was completed in 2014, but the Anderson County portion was not completed until spring 2019.

History
SH 19 was one of the original 25 Texas state highways proposed on June 21, 1917, overlaid on top of the Paris-Houston Highway. The original proposal was for it to run from the Texas/Oklahoma border north of Paris to Houston. On February 5, 1918, it extended south to Freeport. On August 21, 1923, SH 19 was pared back significantly, eliminating the section north of Grand Saline. On August 4, 1932, it had extended north to Alba. On May 13, 1935, it was rerouted to end in Fruitvale. On September 4, 1935, an eventual extension via Emory, Commerce, Ladonia, and Bonham to Oklahoma was proposed. On August 1, 1936, the section from Canton to Grand Saline was restored as SH 19T. SH 19T was cancelled when the rerouting of SH 19 from Canton to Fruitvale opened. On September 26, 1939, the sections south of Palestine which were cosigned with US 287 and US 75 were dropped. One section became part of SH 45 (now SH 30), and another was renumbered to SH 288. On April 15, 1940, SH 19 was extended north to Sulphur Springs, a modification of the much longer proposed extension that was not designated. On September 26, 1945, SH 19 was routed over FM 647 from 1 mile south of the Hopkins County Line through Emory to Dunbar.  On August 24, 1960, it was extended northward to its original starting point of Paris and again to the south to Huntsville, replacing a portion of SH 45. On May 21, 1979, SH 19 was extended over Loop 405 in Huntsville.

SH 19A was a spur route of SH 19 that was originally planned on February 18, 1919, splitting off at Angleton and traveling to Palacios. On March 19, 1923, it extended east to Galveston and west to Ganado, with the old route to Palacios being changed to SH 19B. On August 21, 1923, the route had been renumbered as SH 58 (now SH 35).

SH 19B was a spur route of SH 19 that was originally planned on March 19, 1923, from Midfield to Palacios replacing part of rerouted SH 19A.
On August 21, 1923, the route had been renumbered as SH 59.

Junction list

Business routes
SH 19 has one business route.

Athens business loop

Business State Highway 19-J (Bus. The route was designated on May 27, 2004 after SH 19 proper was re-routed east onto the Jed Robinson Loop, also designated as US 175, SH 31 and Loop 7 (formerly FM 317). Bus. SH 19-J begins at an interchange with the Jed Robinson Loop and SH 19, north of downtown Athens, heading south on North Palestine Street, while SH 19 heads east along the loop around the city. Bus. SH 19-J continues south through the town square, which is the location of the Henderson County Courthouse and also comprises the junction with Bus. SH 31-H (Tyler Street) and Bus. US 175-G (Corsicana Street). For a short distance, the business route is paralleled by FM 2494, which takes South Praireville Street, before cutting east, away from Bus. SH 19-J on Lakeside Drive. The business route curves southeast, still following Palestine Street, past the northern terminus of FM 59 at West Cayuga Drive, before reaching its southern terminus at the Jim Robinson Loop, where SH 19 splits from Loop 7 and serves as a continuation of the route.

Major intersections

References

External links

019
Transportation in Lamar County, Texas
Transportation in Delta County, Texas
Transportation in Hopkins County, Texas
Transportation in Rains County, Texas
Transportation in Van Zandt County, Texas
Transportation in Henderson County, Texas
Transportation in Anderson County, Texas
Transportation in Houston County, Texas
Transportation in Trinity County, Texas
Transportation in Walker County, Texas